Mohammad Mahdi Salih Al-Rawi is an Iraqi politician who was Trade Minister in the government of President Saddam Hussein. He was the Minister of Finance from 1989 to 1991.

Pre-War Career
Salih was born between 1947 and 1949 in Al Anbar Governorate in western Iraq.  He was the Chief of Saddam Hussein's Presidential Office in the mid-1980s and then became Minister of Trade from 1987 until the downfall of Hussein. 
In October 1995, the United States listed al Salih as a Designated Individual under their programme of sanctions against Iraq.

2003 Iraq War
Following the United States-led invasion of Iraq in 2003, the United States distributed a set of playing cards listing the "most wanted" members which included al-Saleh as the "six of hearts". His assets were frozen under United Nations Security Council Resolution 1483 as a former official. He was taken into custody by the US on 23 April 2003. He was held by the US military at Camp Cropper, a base just outside Baghdad. In July 2010, seven years after his capture, he was handed over to the custody of the Iraq government.

In 2011 he was found innocent of charges against him and in March 2012 he was released by the Iraqi authorities and immediately left the country.

Post-War
Following the 2013 Al Anbar governorate election, Salih was rumoured to be a candidate supported by the Uniters List for the position of Governor of Anbar. The Uniters List later denied the rumours.
In 2014 he was living in Amman, Jordan.

References

Living people
1940s births
Arab Socialist Ba'ath Party – Iraq Region politicians
Finance ministers of Iraq
Most-wanted Iraqi playing cards
Iraq War prisoners of war
Iraqi prisoners of war
Prisoners and detainees of the United States military
Prisoners and detainees of Iraq